Udo Uibo (born 5 May 1956 in Viljandi) is an Estonian literary critic, editor, translator and lexicographer.

From 1997 until 2005, he was the chief editor of Looming.

In 2001, he was awarded with Order of the White Star, V class.

References

1956 births
Living people
Estonian literary critics
Estonian translators
Estonian magazine editors
Lexicographers
People from Viljandi
Looming (magazine) editors